Germany competed at the 1908 Summer Olympics in London, United Kingdom.

Medalists

Results by event

Athletics

Germany's best athletics result was a silver medal in the medley relay.

Cycling

Germany's best cycling result was the silver medal won in the team pursuit event.

Diving

Germany dominated the springboard diving in 1908, taking all three medals in the event (including a tie for third place with an American diver).

Fencing

Figure skating

Gymnastics

Hockey

Rowing

Shooting

Germany had one shooter compete in one event, placing last in the 49-man field.

Swimming

Tennis

Germany was the second-most successful nation in tennis in 1908, winning a silver medal in the men's singles to prevent Great Britain from sweeping the silver medals as well as the 6 gold medals.

Wrestling

Sources
 
 

Nations at the 1908 Summer Olympics
1908
Olympics